"One for the Road" is a song by English band Arctic Monkeys from their fifth studio album, AM.
It was released on 9 December 2013 as the fourth single from the album. The single is available in the 7" vinyl format, and as a digital download, and features a B-side titled "You're So Dark". On 6 December 2013, Arctic Monkeys released the B-side's official audio track onto YouTube.

Music and composition
"One for the Road" is a rock song with R&B influences. Featuring backing vocals from rock musician and Humbug producer Josh Homme, the song also features influences from Homme's band, Queens of the Stone Age. The song starts with high-pitched "woo" sounds performed by drummer Matt Helders and continues with "a bluesy chunky riff" and "Americana-tinged rockabilly twang."

Music video
A music video for the song, filmed in Mendota, Illinois, was released on 23 October 2013. It was shot in black-and-white, and directed by Focus Creeps, with whom the band previously worked on several videos in 2011 and 2012, including the NME Award-winning video for "R U Mine?". The video shows Arctic Monkeys guitarist Jamie Cook driving tractors in three-piece suits, the band striking poses in a cornfield, and a party featuring models and fireworks.

Track listing

Personnel
Arctic Monkeys
Alex Turner – vocals, lead and rhythm guitar, tambourine
Jamie Cook – lead and rhythm guitar
Nick O'Malley – bass guitar, baritone guitar, backing vocals
Matt Helders – drums, percussion, backing vocals

Additional musicians
James Ford – keyboards, tambourine
Josh Homme – backing vocals (track 1)

Charts

Certifications

Release history

References

2013 songs
2013 singles
Arctic Monkeys songs
Domino Recording Company singles
Songs written by Alex Turner (musician)
Song recordings produced by James Ford (musician)
Songs written by Jamie Cook
Songs written by Nick O'Malley
Songs written by Matt Helders